The Schwyz Alps are a mountain range in Switzerland. They form part of the North-Eastern Swiss Alps and are bordered by the Glarus Alps to the east, the Appenzell Alps to the north-east, the Emmental Alps in the west, and the Uri Alps to the south-west. The Klausen Pass is the highest point between the Schwyz Alps and the Glarus Alps.

The Schwyzer Alps extend beyond the boundaries of the canton of Schwyz, including parts of the cantons of Glarus, Luzern, Uri and Zug. Just south of the Glärnisch is the Bös Fulen, the highest point in the canton of Schwyz.

Geography

Principal summits
The principal summits of the Schwyzer Alps are:

See also
Swiss Alps
List of mountains of the canton of Schwyz
List of mountains of the canton of Glarus
List of mountains of Uri

Landforms of the canton of Schwyz
Landforms of the canton of Zug
Landforms of the canton of St. Gallen
Landforms of the canton of Uri
Landforms of the canton of Lucerne
Mountain ranges of the Alps
Mountain ranges of Switzerland
Swiss Alps